Lagoncinha Bridge is a medieval bridge crossing the Ave River in Lousado, Vila Nova de Famalicão, in Portugal. The bridge was classified as a National Monument in 1943.

Characteristics
The bridge features six uneven arches with cutwaters. It is possibly a reconstruction of a pre-existing Roman bridge, with characteristics attributable to the Late Middle Ages and similarities to many other bridges built in Northern Portugal during the XIII century.  

The bridge was subject to studies performed by investigators from the University of Porto, at the behest of Direção-Geral dos Edifícios e Monumentos Nacionais.
It was found that the structure was in risk due to heavy traffic. In 2018, the bridge underwent major renovation works that cut traffic for five months.

See also
List of bridges in Portugal

References

Sources

Further reading

Lagoncinha
National monuments in Braga District
Vila Nova de Famalicão
Listed bridges in Portugal
Bridges over the Ave River